was a professional wrestling event promoted by DDT Pro-Wrestling (DDT). The event took place on August 17, 2014, in Tokyo at the Ryōgoku Kokugikan. The event featured eleven matches, four of which were contested for championships. The event aired on Fighting TV Samurai.

Storylines
The Ryōgoku Peter Pan 2014 event featured eleven professional wrestling matches that involved different wrestlers from pre-existing scripted feuds and storylines. Wrestlers portrayed villains, heroes, or less distinguishable characters in the scripted events that built tension and culminated in a wrestling match or series of matches.

By winning the King of DDT tournament on June 29, Isami Kodaka earned a title match in the main event against KO-D Openweight Champion Harashima. Kenny Omega was later added to the match, making it a three-way.

Event
The first dark match was a Tokyo Joshi Pro Wrestling exhibition match featuring Kanna, Erin, Chikage Kiba, Yuka Sakazaki, Shoko Nakajima and Miyu Yamashita.

The second dark match was a "DDT vs. Union Pro-Wrestling" eight-man tag team match pitting a team of four DDT wrestlers against four Union Pro wrestlers.

On the main card, Mikami teamed up with Pro-Wrestling Freedoms' Gentaro to face the team of Yasu Urano and Akito.

The next match was the "Souken Group Presents Ironman Heavymetalweight Championship Battle Royale", a Rumble rules match for the Ironman Heavymetalweight Championship that saw Akihiro, an inflatable love doll, enter as the champion. LiLiCo was the special guest ring announcer. Amongst the participants was Kizaemon Saiga, a mixed martial artist. During the match, DJ Nira pinned Akihiro to eliminate it from the match and become the 1,007th champion. Gorgeous Matsuno then eliminated DJ Nira to win the match and become the 1,008th champion.

After the match, LiLiCo pinned Gorgeous Matsuno by surprise to become the 1,009th champion, by virtue of the championship's 24/7 rule.

The next match saw the participation of Aja Kong from Oz Academy.

The "Important Something Time Bombing Deathmatch" was a match in which "an important something" was to be blown up after ten minutes had gone by. Just before the match, it was announced that the important something was the anus of Ryota Yamasato, a comedian who acted as an interviewer for DDT.

In the next match, Sanshiro Takagi teamed up with Jun Kasai from Pro-Wrestling Freedoms to face Minoru Suzuki and Michael Nakazawa in a Falls Count Anywhere Street Fight that saw the action spill out all around the arena.

In the next match, Kota Ibushi fought Shuji Kondo from Wrestle-1.

In the next match, Konosuke Takeshita faced Hiroshi Tanahashi from New Japan Pro-Wrestling.

Results

Rumble rules match

Three-way elimination match

Footnotes

References

External links
The official DDT Pro-Wrestling website
Ryōgoku Peter Pan 2014 at ProWrestlingHistory.com

DDT Peter Pan
2014 in professional wrestling
August 2014 events in Japan
Professional wrestling in Tokyo
2014 in Tokyo
Events in Tokyo